New Edinburgh News is a local newspaper published in New Edinburgh, a community in Ottawa. The publication was founded in 1976. The current editor of the newspaper is Christina Leadlay. This newspaper is subscribed to by the Governor General of Canada and the Prime Minister of Canada. The embassies of France and South Africa also subscribe to this local newspaper.

Current and archival editions of the paper are available as PDF to download on its website: newedinburgh.ca

The paper provides extensive coverage for local issues (e.g. the unsuccessful fight leading up to and after the closure of Crichton Street Public School in 1999.

Editors of the paper
Eleanor Dunn - 1976–unknown
Mick Glover - unknown
Barbara Benoit - 1993–1999
Carolyn Brereton - 2000–2005
Cindy Parkanyi - 2005–2014
Christina Leadlay - 2014–present

Contributors
Elizabeth May - Leader of the Green Party of Canada.

Interviewees
Adrienne Clarkson - former Governor General of Canada

References 

Newspapers published in Ottawa
Publications established in 1976
1976 establishments in Ontario